This is a list of events expected for the 2020s in Angola:

2020
 5 February - Isabel dos Santos, the billionaire daughter of former president José Eduardo dos Santos is investigated for embezzling from the state oil company and money laundering.

2021
 24 July to 8 August - Angola is expected to take part in the 2021 summer olympics.

2022
 Per the new Constitution of Angola, the second and current President of Angola, José Eduardo dos Santos, will have to leave the office in 2022 if he is reelected in the next general election.

References

 
Angola